"Straight Outta Compton" is a song by American hip hop group N.W.A. It was released on July 10, 1988 as the lead single from their debut album of the same name. It also appears on N.W.A's Greatest Hits with an extended mix and The Best of N.W.A: The Strength of Street Knowledge. It was voted number 19 on About.com's Top 100 Rap Songs, and is ranked number 6 on VH1's 100 Greatest Songs of Hip Hop.

In 2015, "Straight Outta Compton" debuted at number 38 on the Billboard Hot 100 on the issue dated September 5, 2015 as a result of the recent releases of the group's film of the same name and Dr. Dres Compton; it was the highest debut on the chart that week. This became the group's first top 40 hit song, in large part due to lack of airplay since N.W.A was banned from many radio stations in the 1980s, charting 27 years after its initial release and 24 years since the group originally disbanded. In 2021, Rolling Stone listed the song at #248 on their updated list of the 500 Greatest Songs of All Time.

Content
"Straight Outta Compton" is a hip hop song. The opening verse is rapped by Ice Cube. MC Ren delivers the second, and Eazy-E the third verse. Dr. Dre does the intro as well as introducing Eazy E's verse. Eazy-E also introduces MC Ren's verse.

Tributes
The song, especially Ice Cube's verse is referenced quite often by rappers, and not infrequently by Cube himself.
In the song "Compton" by The Game, he says "Nigga, I'ma keep on stompin', comin' straight outta Compton"

Music video
The video, directed by Rupert Wainwright, features Dr. Dre, Ice Cube, Eazy-E, MC Ren, Krazy Dee, and DJ Yella. The video shows the group walking and posing throughout various parts of the city of Compton. Ice Cube and Ren are chased by the police during their verses, arrested, and put in a holding van. Eazy-E's verse shows him riding alongside the van in a convertible, yelling at the driver who ignores him. As the van leaves the neighborhood local residents throw rocks at it. In the clean version of the video, profanities have edited lyrics by rappers' voices, including words like "fuck" changed to "get" from time to time with different words as well. It first aired in May 1989.

Cover art
The record cover image for the Straight Outta Compton single and maxi-single covers, known as "The Bleacher Shot" was created by Greek-American photographer (and regular Priority Records free-lancer), Ithaka Darin Pappas. The black and white version of the picture used on the cover was converted from the color original. The picture, which was not scheduled to be used as a cover image, was made spontaneously on March 14, 1989 at MacArthur Park, Los Angeles while NWA was waiting for a film crew to arrive at the park to interview them. The Bleacher Shot has also been used as a color poster for Word Up! (magazine) and as part of NWA's induction ceremony and official printed program of the 2016 Rock and Roll Hall of Fame ceremony in Brooklyn, New York presentation.

Cover versions

 The song was parodied in the 1993 film CB4 as "Straight out of Locash" by CB4.
 In 1998, Compton rappers, MC Eiht, King Tee and Dresta recorded a tribute remix of the song that appeared on Straight Outta Compton: N.W.A. 10th Anniversary Tribute.
 In 2000, Queensbridge, New York rappers Cormega, Blaq Poet and Jungle released a song called "Straight Outta Queensbridge", using the same beat. It appears on Nas's album "QB's Finest"
 In 2001, horrorcore artist Blaze Ya Dead Homie released a cover entitled "Str8 Outta Detroit" on his debut album 1 Less G n da Hood, featuring fellow Psychopathic Records' artists Anybody Killa and Violent J (of Insane Clown Posse), with slightly changed lyrics to reflect their native city of Detroit.
 Compton rapper The Game released his own version of this song with the same beat on his 2003 mixtape, You Know What It Is Vol. 1.
 In 2004, rapper Young Buck album is called Straight Outta Cashville under G-Unit Records.
 Veruca Salt vocalist Nina Gordon recorded an acoustic "coffeehouse" version of the song at L.A.'s Largo in 2005.
 Weird Al Yankovic parodied the line in the title of his 2006 album, Straight Outta Lynwood.
 In 2007, The McDonald's Main Men parodied the song as "Straight Outta Clacton", which went viral on YouTube with over 250,000 views. The song is a reference to the town of Clacton-on-Sea, Essex in the United Kingdom.
 In 2008, G-Unit recorded a song called "Straight Outta Southside" from their second album T.O.S: Terminate on Sight.
 In 2008, Chap-hop artist Mr. B The Gentleman Rhymer released a parody entitled "Straight Out of Surrey".
 On May 28, 2010, Ice Cube performed the song with The Roots on Late Night with Jimmy Fallon. It was performed for the audience during the warmup prior to taping, and was recorded on a crew member's iPhone. The performance was broadcast on Late Night with Jimmy Fallon on July 8, 2010. The first 30 seconds of the song was also parodied on the show as part of a series of "raps" by NBC newsanchor, Brian Williams, through various news clips of Williams talking strung together over the actual music.
 In 2011, the song was used in the film Take Me Home Tonight.
 In 2012, the song was used in the films 21 Jump Street, which Ice Cube starred in, and The Watch.
 In 2012, Captain Dan and The Scurvy Crew and Skull Branded Pirates covered the song together as "Straight Outta Kingston". The title is a reference to Kingston Harbour of Port Royal, a pirate stronghold in the 17th century.
 In 2012, the song was used in the video game Twisted Metal for the PlayStation 3
 The song was parodied and played in 2 episodes of The Cleveland Show.
Jimmy Fallon regularly attempts to perform the song on The Tonight Show during the "History of Rap" segments, only to be stopped and teased by Justin Timberlake.
 A similar beat to the one used in "Straight Outta Compton" is used in the episode "The Crew" of the show The Amazing World Of Gumball in the song "We Are The Senior Citizens".

Charts

Charts

Certifications

References

External links

 2nd Official Site of N.W.A.
 Official N.W.A. Legacy site

1988 singles
1988 songs
N.W.A songs
Hardcore hip hop songs
Gangsta rap songs
Songs about California
Songs about Los Angeles
Songs written by MC Ren
Songs written by Ice Cube
Song recordings produced by Dr. Dre
Ruthless Records singles
Priority Records singles